The RT.X100 Pro Suite was a real-time PCI video editing card manufactured by Matrox Corporation. With the use of Adobe Premiere it enabled a real time preview on TV or Video Monitor. It was generally bundled with Adobe Premiere Pro (video editing software), Adobe Audition (digital audio editor), and Adobe Encore DVD (for the creation of DVDs). The RT.X100 Pro Collection added a copy of Adobe After Effects (special effects software). It was released in 2003 and meant to replace the Matrox RT2500.

See also
 AMD FirePro

External links 
RT.X100 Home Page

Graphics hardware
Graphics processing units